The 1954 Cal Aggies football team represented the College of Agriculture at Davis—now known as the University of California, Davis—as a member of the Far Western Conference (FWC) during the 1954 college football season. Led by first-year head coach Will Lotter, the Aggies compiled an overall record of 1–7 with a mark of 1–4 in conference play, placing fifth in the FWC. The team was outscored by its opponents 226 to 47 for the season. The Cal Aggies played home games at Aggie Field in Davis, California.

Schedule

Notes

References

Cal Aggies
UC Davis Aggies football seasons
Cal Aggies football